The Connecticut Library Association (CLA) is a professional organization for Connecticut's librarians and library workers. It is headquartered in Belchertown, Massachusetts. It was founded on February 23, 1891, in New Haven, Connecticut, with the purpose of  promoting "library interests by discussion and interchange of ideas and methods, and not to 'trench upon the province of the American Library Association.'" The first regular CLA meeting was held in the Wadsworth Atheneum in May 1891. CLA's initial membership was thirty people and dues were fifty cents.  The first CLA president of the Association was Addison Van Name who served from the organization's founding in 1891 to 1892. CLA urged the state of Connecticut to provide incentives for towns to make their libraries public. The state responded by offering grants of up to $200 yearly for libraries to spend on books.

References

External links
 Connecticut Library Association website

Library associations in the United States
Organizations based in Connecticut